Sohrab may refer to:

People
Sohrab, one of Shahnama's characters
Sohrab Aarabi, Iranian man whose murder drew international attention to the 2009 Iranian election protests
Sohrab Ahmari, an Iranian-American journalist 
Sohrab Bakhtiarizadeh, an Iranian football player
Sohrab Fakir, a Sufi singer
Sohrab Khan Gorji, a courtier in Qajar Iran of Georgian origin
Sohrab Mehmed Pasha, an Ottoman official
Sohrab Modi (1897–1984), Indian theatre and film actor, director and producer
Sohrab Sepehri, was a notable modern Iranian poet and a painter
Sohrab Shahid-Sales, an Iranian film director
Mirza Ahmad Sohrab (1890–1958), Persian-American author
Ardeshir Burjorji Sorabji Godrej (1868–1936), Indian businessman co-founder of the Godrej Group

Places
Sohrab, Fars, a village in Fars Province, Iran
Sohrab, Iran, a village in Kerman Province, Iran

Businesses
Sohrab Cycles, a Pakistani bicycle manufacturer